Reno is only 14 miles over the California border. The Nevada Gaming Commission groups it as one gaming region, with a total of five casinos earning more than $72 million in the last fiscal year. In other reports the Reno region is consolidated with the Sparks region which is only four miles farther east on Interstate 80.

Indian casino competition
Unlike Las Vegas, the Reno/Sparks region built only one major new casino since the 1990s, the Silver Legacy Reno. The older casinos, particularly the Atlantis and the Peppermill, have been updated and new hotel towers have been added. Reno is competing with the United Auburn Indian Community which has built the large Thunder Valley Casino Resort in Lincoln, California. This casino is off Interstate 80 on the drive from San Francisco and Sacramento, California. In addition to being 80 miles closer, it is also at low altitude, so that it is not necessary to cross the Sierra Nevada mountain range which frequently becomes hazardous in winter. Further competition arrived on December 18, 2008 with the opening of the Red Hawk Casino run by the Shingle Springs Band of Miwok Indians. The Red Hawk Casino is also very close to Sacramento.

Ray Hagar from the Reno Gazette-Journal said, "The competition from tribal casinos was once a thorn in Reno's side. Now, it is poised to be the dagger in the heart of Reno-Sparks and Lake Tahoe properties that can't afford to join in the Cold War-style escalation of the Atlantis and Peppermill expansions."

Largest casinos

According to the abstract, there are thirteen thousand rooms in the Reno casinos. For FY08 gaming revenue was $872m and non-gaming revenue was $733m. Casinos with revenue over $36 million had 77% of the gaming revenue, and 82% of the non-gaming revenue.

There are ten casinos in Washoe County, many of which are nearby Reno, but are not classified as being in Reno/Sparks region by the Nevada Gaming Commission. Boomtown Reno and Gold Ranch Reno to the west of the city and Tamarack Junction to the south are examples of casinos in this group.

Revenue History
Gaming Revenue in the Reno area peaked in June 2006 as competition from Sacramento Indian casinos intensified. Revenue began to rapidly decrease from that point as the recession took over.

All figures are in thousands of dollars and show the change over a 4-year period.

References

External links
 Visit Reno list of Casinos and Interactive Map
 City of Reno

Economy of Reno, Nevada
Gambling in Nevada